Birdland is the debut album by English Indie rock band Birdland, released on Lazy Records in 1991.

Track listing

References

1991 albums